KRLT (93.9 FM) is a radio station broadcasting a Hot adult contemporary format, branded as 93-9 The Lake. The Monday thru Friday On-Air line-up: 6-10am Howie Nave, 10am-2pm Nick Reynolds, Stacy Lynn 2-6pm and Steve Harness 6pm – 9pm. Licensed to South Lake Tahoe, California, USA, it serves the Lake Tahoe, California/Nevada, area. The station is owned by D&H Broadcasting, LLC. The General Manager for D&H Broadcasting Radio-Lake Tahoe is Steve Harness. The General Sales Manager and Events Manager is Bryan Vargem. KRLT & sister station KOWL are programmed by Nick Reynolds.

References

External links

KRLT website

RLT
NBC Radio Network affiliates